Muriel's Wedding is a 1994 Australian comedy-drama film written and directed by P.J. Hogan. The film, which stars Toni Collette, Rachel Griffiths, Jeanie Drynan, Sophie Lee, and Bill Hunter, focuses on the socially awkward Muriel whose ambition is to have a glamorous wedding and improve her personal life by moving from her dead-end hometown, the fictional Porpoise Spit, to Sydney.

The film premiered at the 1994 Toronto International Film Festival and was released in Australia on 29 September 1994. It received positive reviews and earned multiple award nominations, including a Golden Globe Award nomination for Best Actress in a Motion Picture – Musical or Comedy (Collette).

Plot
Muriel Heslop, a socially awkward young woman, is the target of ridicule by her shallow and egotistical friends, Tania, Cheryl, Janine, and Nicole. She spends her time listening to ABBA songs and perpetually daydreams of a glamorous wedding to get her out of the dead-end beach town of Porpoise Spit and away from her domineering father, Bill, a corrupt politician who constantly belittles his wife, Betty, and five children.

Muriel attends the wedding of Tania and Chook, during which she sees Chook and Nicole having sex in a laundry room. Wedding guest Dianne, a department store detective, calls the police on Muriel for stealing the dress she is wearing, and the police publicly escort Muriel out of the reception.

Soon after, Bill's rumored mistress, Deidre Chambers, recruits Muriel into her multilevel marketing business, and Muriel's "friends" officially kick her out of their group after clarifying that she won't be accompanying them on an island holiday. Betty signs a blank cheque for Muriel to buy products for the cosmetics business, but Muriel instead uses the cheque to withdraw $12,000 and follow her former friends to the island anyway. There, Muriel runs into Rhonda Epinstall, an old high school acquaintance, and they quickly strike up a friendship, cemented when Rhonda gleefully tells Tania about Nicole and Chook.

Muriel returns home and is confronted by Betty regarding the stolen money. Muriel immediately runs away to Sydney, sharing a flat with Rhonda and changing her name to Mariel. She gets a job at a video store, meets and briefly dates an awkward but kind man, Brice Nobes.

One night, Rhonda suddenly falls down, apparently paralyzed. While at the hospital, Muriel calls home and learns her father is being investigated for taking bribes. Rhonda has a cancerous tumour in her spine and undergoes multiple operations, eventually leaving her permanently unable to walk. Muriel promises Rhonda to look after her and never let her go back to Porpoise Spit. She also uses Rhonda's health crisis to obtain pampered service at numerous bridal shops, trying on wedding dresses and taking photographs to indulge her wedding dreams. When Rhonda discovers what Muriel has done, Muriel finally confesses to her fixation on a storybook wedding, and they have an angry fight.

Desperate, Muriel enters into a conspiracy to marry South African swimmer David Van Arkle so that he can join Team Australia in the upcoming Olympics; she is paid $10,000 by David's parents for her part in the scheme. At Muriel's elaborate wedding in Sydney, she shows off Tania, Cheryl, and Janine as her bridesmaids; Rhonda, disgusted by Muriel's behavior, refuses to be one. Bill openly treats Deidre as his date, and Betty arrives late to the wedding due to being unable to afford plane tickets; Muriel doesn't notice her at the wedding. Rhonda moves back to her mother's home, unable to live in Sydney without help. After the wedding, David makes his contempt for Muriel clear to her.

In Porpoise Spit, an increasingly distraught Betty shoplifts a pair of sandals she tries on, and Dianne calls the police. Bill arranges for the charges to disappear. Soon after Betty pleads with Bill, telling him that she needs help, he announces his intention to divorce her and marry Deidre. Betty is later found dead by her daughter, Joanie. Deidre claims Betty had a heart attack, but Joanie reveals to Muriel that Betty's death was suicide.

When Muriel breaks down at her mother's funeral, David comforts her, and they finally consummate their marriage. Her mother's death forces Muriel to take a hard look at her life, and she tells David that she can no longer remain married to him as neither of them are in love, and she wants to stop lying.

Bill asks Muriel to help raise her siblings, as Deidre is less likely to marry him with the children in tow. He has also lost his job on city council. Muriel stands up to him, giving him $5,000 of her wedding money and telling him she will repay the rest of the stolen amount when she gets a job in Sydney. Impressing her father with her more assertive personality, Muriel demands that he stop his verbally abusive treatment of her siblings.
 
Muriel goes to Rhonda's house, where Muriel's former tormentors are visiting, and offers to take her back to Sydney. Rhonda accepts and lets the other girls know what she thinks of them. Muriel and Rhonda head to the airport, happily leaving Porpoise Spit behind for a more promising future.

Cast

Production
The film used Tweed Heads as the locale for Porpoise Spit, although the scene of Muriel and Rhonda leaving Porpoise Spit was filmed in its adjoining "Twin Town", Coolangatta. Other filming locations included Moreton Island, Darlinghurst, the Gold Coast, Elanora, Tugun, Parramatta, Kensington, Surfers Paradise and Sydney.

For the role of Muriel, Toni Collette gained 18 kg (40 lb) in seven weeks.

Release
The film premiered at the Toronto International Film Festival in September 1994 and opened in Australia at the end of the month, a month after another Australian film, The Adventures of Priscilla, Queen of the Desert.

Critical reception

Muriel's Wedding received positive reviews from critics and has a score of 80% on Rotten Tomatoes, based on 45 reviews, with an average rating of 6.9/10. The critical consensus states "Heartfelt and quirky, though at times broad, Muriel's Wedding mixes awkward comedy, oddball Australian characters, and a nostalgia-heavy soundtrack." The film also has a score of 63 out of 100 on Metacritic, based on 14 critics, indicating 'Generally favorable reviews'

Roger Ebert of the Chicago Sun-Times stated the film "is merciless in its portrait of provincial society, and yet has a huge affection for its misfit survivors...has a lot of big and little laughs in it, but also a melancholy undercurrent, which reveals itself toward the end of the film in a series of surprises and unexpected developments...The film's good heart keeps it from ever making fun of Muriel, although there are moments that must have been tempting."

Peter Stack of the San Francisco Chronicle wrote "With such recent hits as Strictly Ballroom and Priscilla, Queen of the Desert, Australia seems to be cornering the market for odd but delightful comedies laced with substance and romance. The latest, Muriel's Wedding, is another bright, occasionally brilliant, example... the movie is much meatier than its larky comic sheen leads you to think at first...There's poignant drama in this brash, sometimes overstated film, and Muriel's transformation is truly touching."

Peter Travers of Rolling Stone called it "exuberantly funny...a crowd pleaser that spices a tired formula with genuine feeling... In the final scenes, when Hogan dares to let his humor turn edgy, Collette's performance gains in force, and Muriel's Wedding becomes a date you want to keep."

Box office
Muriel's Wedding grossed AU$2.2 million in its opening week in Australia (September 1994) from 72 screens, at that time the third biggest opening for an Australian film behind two films starring Paul Hogan (no relation to the director of Muriel's Wedding)Crocodile Dundee II (1988) and Lightning Jack (1994). It went on to gross AU$15.8 million (equivalent to AU$ million in ) at the box office in Australia.

It earned US$244,969 on 14 screens in its opening weekend in the US (March 1995) and eventually grossed US$15.1 million in the United States and Canada.

Accolades

Soundtrack
The music of ABBA forms the backbone of the film's soundtrack. Songwriters Björn Ulvaeus and Benny Andersson allowed their use in the film and permitted "Dancing Queen" to be adapted as an orchestral piece. Additional ABBA songs included are "Mamma Mia", "Waterloo", "Fernando", and "I Do, I Do, I Do, I Do, I Do".

ABBA only gave permission for their music to be included in the film two weeks before shooting commenced; the filmmakers were considering changing Muriel's favourite band to The Village People.

Also included in the soundtrack are "Sugar Baby Love" by The Rubettes, "The Tide Is High" by Blondie, "I Go to Rio" by Peter Allen, "Happy Together" by The Turtles, and Schubert's "Ave Maria".

Stage adaptation

In September 2016, it was announced that Sydney Theatre Company would produce a musical adaptation of Muriel's Wedding. Muriel's Wedding the Musical incorporates songs by ABBA as well as original music by Kate Miller-Heidke and Keir Nuttall. P.J. Hogan wrote the musical's book, Simon Phillips directed, and Gabriela Tylesova designed the set and costumes. The musical ran at the Roslyn Packer Theatre from 6 November 2017 through 27 January 2018.

See also
 Cinema of Australia
 Sydney in film
 Four Weddings and a Funeral

References

External links
 
 
Muriel's Wedding at Oz Movies
 
 
 
 
 Muriel's Wedding at the National Film and Sound Archive
 UrbanCinefile.com article 
 Muriel's Wedding at Screen Australia

1994 films
1990s romantic comedy-drama films
Adultery in films
Australian romantic comedy-drama films
French romantic comedy-drama films
Films about weddings
Films set in New South Wales
Films set in Sydney
Films shot in Sydney
Films shot in Queensland
Films directed by P. J. Hogan
Films scored by Peter Best (composer)
Miramax films
Roadshow Entertainment films
1994 directorial debut films
1994 comedy films
1994 drama films
1990s female buddy films
Films shot on the Gold Coast, Queensland
1990s English-language films
1990s French films